Rasana Atreya is an Indian English-language author. Her debut novel Tell A Thousand Lies was shortlisted for the "2012 Tibor Jones South Asia prize." 
She is also the India ambassador for the Alliance of Independent Authors.

Biography 
Rasana completed her schooling at Kendriya Vidyalaya schools across the country and has a B.E. in Instrumentation engineering from Osmania University, India, and M.S. in Computer engineering from Marquette University, Milwaukee, United States. She is also a trained 'Volunteer Rape Crisis' counselor by Bay Area Women Against Rape organization. She is the founder of The India Readathon, a platform which aims to introduce readers to self-published books (ebooks and audio) set in the Indian subcontinent (India, Pakistan, Sri Lanka, Bangladesh, Burma, Nepal and Maldives). Her other novels include Temple Is Not My Father, 28 Years A Bachelor, and Valley Isle Secrets (a Kindle Worlds novella based on Toby Neal's Lei Crime Series).

Critical acclaim 
Tell A Thousand Lies was shortlisted for the 2012 Tibor Jones South Asia Award. While her first three novels handle woman-centric issues, with Valley Isle Secrets, she has ventured into thriller genre.

Rasana declined a traditional publishing contract in order to self-publish. She has been interviewed on self-publishing by many major publications in India.

Workshops and panels 
 Panelist, Navigating the Road to Self Publishing, Times Lit Fest. 4 December 2016 (with Neal Thompson, Director of Author and Publishing Relations, Amazon)
 Workshop. The Art of Self Publishing at the Hyderabad Lit Fest, 24 January 2015.
 Panelist on publishing, Hyderabad Literary Festival 20 January 2013 (with Kulpreet Yadav)
 Panelist on publishing, Jaipur Literary Festival 24 January 2013 (with Meru Gokhale, Editor-in-Chief, Random House, UK; Alexandra Pringle, Editor-in-Chief Bloomsbury; Rick Simonson, Artemis Kirk)

Bibliography 
 Tell A Thousand Lies
 Temple Is Not My Father
 28 Years A Bachelor
 Valley Isle Secrets

References 

Living people
Indian women novelists
English-language writers from India
Writers from Bangalore
20th-century Indian novelists
Women writers from Karnataka
Osmania University alumni
20th-century Indian women writers
Novelists from Karnataka
Year of birth missing (living people)